The Wanquan River is the third longest river in Hainan Province, China, and is 162 km long. It rises in the Wuzhi Mountain, and flows generally northeast turbulently in a narrow route through mountainous regions. About half way downstream, it enters Qionghai. Here the river bed widens and the water flows gently, and on the banks are mostly coconut trees and banana plantations. For its last 30 km, the river makes a southeast turn, and before it empties into the South China Sea at Bo'ao, where it joins the Longgun River and Jiuqu River in a common estuary.

In the ballet, Red Detachment of Women, the People's Liberation Army set their camp beside the Wanquan River.

References

External links

Rivers of Hainan